Edward, Ed or Ted Hooper may refer to:

Ed Hooper (politician) (born 1947), Florida politician
Ed Hooper (born 1964), American journalist
Edward W. Hooper (1839–1901), Union soldier
Edward Hooper (MP), British lawyer and politician
Edward Hooper (born 1951), UK writer on Oral polio vaccine AIDS hypothesis
Ted Hooper (1918–2010), British beekeeper
Ted Hooper (rugby league) (1871–1925), Australian rugby league referee and administrator

See also
Hooper (surname)